Who Will Save the World? The Mighty Groundhogs is a 1972 album recorded by The Groundhogs, originally released by United Artists Records in 1972, catalogue number UAS-5570. The most recent CD reissue is that of 2003 by EMI Records, catalogue number 07243-584815-2-5.

The sleeve artwork takes the form of a comic book featuring the Groundhogs depicted as superheroes, drawn by comic book artist Neal Adams. In the story they fight the personified evils of Over-Population, Pollution, War, "Pig Business" and "Sacred Cow" (Religion), and the Junkie Monkey. Each of the band members takes on a different evil thwarting them to begin with only to have them spin off and wreak havoc on another portion of the globe. The lyrics of each song deal with these themes and despite the comic-book nature of the cover, the lyrics are quite serious being politically and socially motivated.

Track listing
All tracks composed by Tony McPhee; except where indicated
 "Earth Is Not Room Enough" - 4:45
 "Wages of Peace" - 4:33
 "Body in Mind" - 3:45
 "Music is the Food of Thought" - 4:30
 "Bog Roll Blues" - 3:02
 "Death of the Sun" - 3:40
 "Amazing Grace" (Traditional) - 2:20
 "The Grey Maze" - 10:05

Personnel
The Groundhogs
 Tony McPhee – guitars, mellotron, harmonium, vocals
 Peter Cruikshank – bass
 Ken Pustelnik – drums
Technical
Martin Birch, Louis Austin - engineer
Neal Adams - artwork

References

1972 albums
The Groundhogs albums
United Artists Records albums